A Gangster and a Gentleman is the debut studio album by American rapper Styles. The album was released on July 9, 2002, through Ruff Ryders Entertainment and Interscope Records. Styles was the second member of the Lox to record a solo album, after Kiss Tha Game Goodbye by Jadakiss was released in August 2001.

The album contains production by the Alchemist, Rockwilder, Ayatollah, DJ Clue and Swizz Beatz who Styles had worked with previously on various Ruff Ryders recordings including the sophomore album We Are the Streets by The LOX. Californian hip-hop producer the Alchemist contributes two tracks. Guest performers include Jadakiss, Sheek Louch, J-Hood, Eve, Angie Stone, Lil' Mo, M.O.P. and Pharoahe Monch.

The album was certified Gold by RIAA on October 11, 2002.

Singles
The lead single "Good Times" peaked at number 22 on the US Billboard Hot 100 chart and received massive nationwide airplay in 2002. The Ayatollah-produced bonus track "The Life" featuring Pharoahe Monch was also released as a single in 2002 through Rawkus Records.

Track listing

Charts

Weekly charts

Year-end charts

References

Gangster and a Gentleman, A
Gangster and a Gentleman, A
Albums produced by Swizz Beatz
Albums produced by the Alchemist (musician)
Albums produced by Rockwilder
Albums produced by Ayatollah
Interscope Records albums
Ruff Ryders Entertainment albums